This list of theatrical animated feature films consists of animated films produced or released by Sony Pictures, the film division of Sony.

Sony releases films from Sony-owned and non-Sony owned animation studios. Most films listed below are from Sony Pictures Animation which began as a feature animation department of Sony, producing its first feature-length animated film Open Season in 2006. Beginning with 1001 Arabian Nights in 1959, Columbia Pictures and TriStar Pictures have released animated films by other production companies, such as United Productions of America, Aardman Animations, Marvel Entertainment, Madhouse, Aniplex, Funimation, Crunchyroll and Rovio Animation. Additionally, Sony Pictures's Japanese division has helped co-produce and release anime films in that country, such as Cowboy Bebop: The Movie, Tokyo Godfathers, Paprika, Legend of the Millennium Dragon and Marvel Anime Films etc.

Other Studio units have also released films theatrically, primarily the studio's distribution unit Sony Pictures Releasing, which acquires film rights from outside animation studios to release films under the Columbia Pictures or TriStar Pictures film labels.

Films

US releases

Upcoming

International releases

Highest-grossing films 

This list does not include films combining live-action with animation.

Notes 
Release Notes

Studio/Production Notes

See also 
List of Columbia Pictures films
List of TriStar Pictures films

References

External links 

American animated films
Sony Pictures animated films
Lists of American animated films